Fibrocystin is a large, receptor-like protein that is thought to be involved in the tubulogenesis and/or maintenance of duct-lumen architecture of epithelium.
FPC associates with the primary cilia of epithelial cells and co-localizes with the Pkd2 gene product polycystin-2 (PC2), suggesting that these two proteins may function in a common molecular pathway.

Pathology
Mutations of its encoding gene (chromosomal locus 6p12.2) can cause autosomal recessive polycystic kidney disease. PKHD1 gene codes for fibrocystin. Fibrocystin is found in the epithelial cell of both the renal tubule and the bile ducts. A mutation in PKHD1 (can be autosomal recessive pattern or spontaneous mutations) leading to a deficiency in fibrocystin causes characteristic polycystic dilation of both structures.

References

External links
  GeneReviews/NIH/NCBI/UW entry on Polycystic Kidney Disease, Autosomal Recessive
 

Single-pass transmembrane proteins